Derk may refer to:

 Derk (given name), a Dutch masculine given name
 Derk, Kohgiluyeh
 and Boyer-Ahmad, a village in Iran

See also

 Dərk
 Derk-Elsko
 Dirk (disambiguation)
 Durk
 DYRK
 Jaap-Derk